is the earthly remains of a castle structure in Miyazaki Prefecture, Japan.

It was the home castle of the Ito clan and later was controlled by the Shimazu clan. Shimazu Toyohisa was command of the castle.

Current
The castle is now only ruins, with some moats, Low stone wall and earthworks. Sadohara Castle historical museum is on site.

The castle　was listed as one of　the Continued Top 100 Japanese Castles in 2017.

See also
List of Historic Sites of Japan (Miyazaki)

References

Castles in Miyazaki Prefecture
Historic Sites of Japan
Former castles in Japan
Shimazu clan